Bertha Lund Glaeser (Lund; September 28, 1862 – May 5, 1939) was an American physician. She served as Professor of Pediatrics at the Woman's Medical College of Cincinnati.

Early life and education
Bertha Lund was born in Cincinnati, Ohio, September 28, 1862. Her father was Charles A. Lund, a native of Stockholm, Sweden. He acquired his education in Lund University, Lund, Sweden, and devoted his life to being an artist. Bertha's mother was Anna Orfgen, a native of Alsace–Lorraine, whose father was a Russian officer, while her mother was of French birth. Glaeser was the second in a family of six children. Her mother died when she was a very small child and after her father's second marriage, her home life became unpleasant and she was thus, as a young girl, required to care for herself. 

She began her studies at the Cincinnati Public Schools.

At the age of sixteen, she married Andrew Glaeser. He was a Mason and a member of the Odd Fellows, Knights of Pythias and Workmen lodges and other societies. When Bertha was 21 years of age, she was widowed with three young stepchildren, Edward, Nellie, and August. Her own child died in early life. Glaeser reared and educated her stepchildren, giving them every advantage which she could secure for them.

While caring for the children, Glaeser took up the study of medicine under Dr. Joseph Roberts Clauser. She was interested in the work to the extent of continuing her studies in the Woman's Medical College of Pennsylvania in Philadelphia, where she remained through three terms and for a year and a half was connected with its clinic. Later, she spent one year as a student in the Cincinnati School of Medicine and Surgery in the "woman's section".

Career
At the Cincinnati School of Medicine and Surgery, she lectured on diseases of children and also had charge of the clinic. The department was later organized into the Woman's Medical College of Cincinnati (later known as the Laura Memorial College). In her practice, Glaeser made steady and notable progress in a large private practice, making a specialty of the diseases of women and children. In addition, she was for many years, medical examiner for the Massachusetts Mutual Life Insurance Company and also the Masonic Widows and Orphans Relief of Toledo, Ohio.

In 1895, Glaeser went to Europe and studied in Vienna, Berlin, Dresden, and London. Upon her return to the U.S., she resumed her practice in Cincinnati, devoting her attention exclusively to diseases of women and children, in which branch of the profession she was particularly successful. She was a member of the Cincinnati Academy of Medicine, Ohio State Medical Society, and the American Medical Association.

Aside from professional connections, Glaeser was a member of Golden Rod Chapter of the Order of the Eastern Star, of which she was a past worthy matron. She also belonged to the Mistletoe Lodge of the International Association of Rebekah Assemblies and held its highest office. Glaeser belonged to St. Paul Episcopal church. She was not an advocate of woman suffrage, believing that she always had her rights without recourse to the ballot.

Death and legacy
Bertha Lund Glaeser died at Good Samaritan Hospital, Cincinnati, May 5, 1939.

The Bertha Lund Glaeser Fund was established by bequest in 1939 to provide tuition for women students in the College of Medicine at the University of Cincinnati.

References

1862 births
1939 deaths
Physicians from Cincinnati
University of Cincinnati College of Medicine alumni
American pediatricians
Order of the Eastern Star
Academics from Ohio
American medical academics